Solute carrier family 13 (sodium-dependent citrate transporter), member 5 also known as the Na+/citrate cotransporter or mIndy is a protein that in humans is encoded by the SLC13A5 gene. It is the mammalian homolog of the fly Indy gene.

Function 
SLC13A5 is a tricarboxylate plasma transporter with a preference for citrate.

Clinical significance
In 2014, by means of exome sequencing it was determined that a genetic mutation of the SLC13A5 gene is the cause of a rare citrate transporter disorder. Mutations in SLC13A5 cause autosomal recessive epileptic encephalopathy with seizure onset in the first days of life.  Those afflicted suffer from seizures, global developmental delay, movement disorder and hypotonia.

Reduced expression of this gene is associated with longer lifespan in many organisms, including some non-human primates. Increased expression is associated with type 2 diabetes and non-alcoholic fatty liver disease. A sugary diet upregulates the expression of the gene, and so does Interleukin 6 signaling.

References

Further reading

External links 
  - A foundation dedicated to SLC13A5 disorders.

Solute carrier family